Dean Jeffries (born September 29, 1971) is an American politician serving as a member of the West Virginia House of Delegates from the 40th district. He was appointed in September 2018.

Early life and education 
Jeffries was born in Charleston, West Virginia. He earned a Bachelor of Applied Science degree in healthcare administration management from the College of Charleston.

Career 
Jeffries began his career as an area manager for Sun Healthcare. He also worked as a coach at Elkview Middle School and Capital High School. He joined State Farm as a field specialist in 2004 and became an insurance agent in 2006. Jeffries was appointed to the West Virginia House of Delegates in September 2018. He has also served as vice chair of the House Health and Human Resources Committee, chair of the House Enrolled Bills Committee, and co-chair of the House Committee on Flooding.

References 

1971 births
Living people
People from Charleston, West Virginia
People from Kanawha County, West Virginia
College of Charleston alumni
Republican Party members of the West Virginia House of Delegates
Politicians from Charleston, West Virginia